Saint-Hubert may refer to:

People:
 Saint Hubertus, also known as Saint Hubert, was appointed Bishop of Liège in 708 A.D. 

In Belgium:
 Saint-Hubert, Belgium, a municipality in the Belgian province of Luxembourg
 Saint-Hubert Air Base (Base de Saint-Hubert), a military airport located northeast of Saint-Hubert
 Saint-Hubert Airport (Aérodrome de Saint-Hubert), a civilian airport located north of Saint-Hubert

In Canada:
 Saint-Hubert, Quebec, a borough of Longueuil
 Longueuil–Saint-Hubert (AMT), formerly Saint-Hubert (AMT), a railway station
 Montréal/St-Hubert Airport, an airport in Longueuil
 CFB St. Hubert, a former Canadian Forces military base in Longueuil
 St-Hubert, a Canadian restaurant chain
 Saint Hubert Street, a street in Montreal
 Saint-Hubert-de-Rivière-du-Loup, Quebec, a village in the Rivière-du-Loup Regional County Municipality

In France:
 Saint-Hubert, Moselle, a village and commune in the Moselle department
 Moulins-Saint-Hubert, a village and commune in the Meuse department
 Château de Saint-Hubert, a royal mansion in Perray-en-Yvelines
 Château de Saint-Hubert (Chavenon), a mansion in Chavenon, Allier
 Rue Saint-Hubert, a street in the 11th arrondissement of Paris where Marie-Anne Asselin had a studio

In Mauritius:
 Saint-Hubert, Mauritius, a village in Mauritius

Breed of dog:
Chien de Saint-Hubert, French name for the Bloodhound

See also
 Royal Galleries of Saint-Hubert in Brussels
 Saint Hubert's Key